Ufuk Bayraktar (born 12 September 1981) is a Turkish actor.

Life and career 
After finishing high school at Gürsoy College, he decided not to go to university and started to work at Firuzağa Restaurant, which was owned by his father Cevahir Bayraktar in Cihangir. He was discovered by Zeki Demirkubuz, who later cast him in his movies Bekleme Odası and Kader. He eventually appeared in Nuri Bilge Ceylan's İklimler, Semih Kaplanoğlu's Yumurta, Cemal Şan's Ali'nin Sekiz Günü and Feo Aladağ's Ayrılık. On the ATV series Ezel, he portrayed the youth of "Ramiz Dayı", the character played by Tuncel Kurtiz. He subsequently appeared in a number of TV series, including Milat.

He is married to Merve Bayraktar, with whom he has a son named Efe Cevahir.

In 2018, he was sentenced to 6 months in prison after a lengthy trial for being involved in a fight with an unlicensed gun, which was his father's heirloom. In 2020, he was sentenced to 4 years and 5 months in prison after throwing a bottle at a woman and attacking a young guy with a machete.

Filmography

References

External links 

1981 births
Male actors from Istanbul
Turkish male television actors
Turkish male film actors
Living people